Kolbad may refer to:
 Kolbad District
 Kolbad-e Gharbi Rural District
 Kolbad-e Sharqi Rural District